Tchula Lake is a creek in the U.S. state of Mississippi. Despite its name, Tchula Lake is classified by the GNIS as a stream rather than a lake. It is a tributary to the Yazoo River.

Tchula is a name derived from the Choctaw language purported to mean "fox". Variant names are "Little River" and "Tchula River".

References

Rivers of Mississippi
Bodies of water of Holmes County, Mississippi
Bodies of water of Humphreys County, Mississippi
Mississippi placenames of Native American origin